The Craft is the third studio album by American hip hop duo Blackalicious. It was released on Anti- on September 27, 2005. Chief Xcel said, "The Craft is our passion to bring discipline to this music, the passion to keep growing, keep stretching, keep doing things we haven't before." It peaked at number 102 on the Billboard 200 chart. As of 2015, it has sold 67,000 copies in the US.

Critical reception

At Metacritic, which assigns a weighted average score out of 100 to reviews from mainstream critics, the album received an average score of 80, based on 22 reviews, indicating "generally favorable reviews".

Jack Booty of Prefix gave the album a 7.0 out of 10, saying, "[Chief] Xcel's production doesn't stray very far from its R&B and soul influences, but this time it comes without almost any samples, relying sometimes on players from a homebrewed funk band to create clearance-free beats instead."

Exclaim! placed it at number 6 on the "Hip-Hop: Year in Review 2005" list.

Track listing

Charts

References

Further reading

External links
 
 

2005 albums
Blackalicious albums
Anti- (record label) albums